Oktyabrsk is a rural locality (a village) in Uralsky Selsoviet, Uchalinsky District, Bashkortostan, Russia. The population was 234 as of 2010. There are 6 streets.

Geography 
Oktyabrsk is located 47 km southwest of Uchaly (the district's administrative centre) by road. Uralsk is the nearest rural locality.

References 

Rural localities in Uchalinsky District